David Adedeji Adeleke (born November 21, 1992), known professionally as Davido, is an American-born Nigerian singer, songwriter and record producer. Born in Atlanta, US, and raised in Lagos, he made his music debut as a member of the music group KB International. Davido studied business administration at Oakwood University before dropping out to make beats and record vocal references. He rose to fame after releasing "Dami Duro", the second single from his debut studio album Omo Baba Olowo (2012), from which six additional singles—"Back When", "Ekuro", "Overseas", "All of You", "Gbon Gbon", and "Feel Alright"—were taken. In 2012, Davido won the Next Rated award at The Headies. Between 2013 and 2015, he released the hit singles "Gobe", "One of a Kind", "Skelewu", "Aye", "Tchelete (Goodlife)", "Naughty", "Owo Ni Koko", "The Sound" and "The Money". 

In January 2016, Davido announced on Twitter he had signed a record deal with Sony Music and a few months later founded the record label Davido Music Worldwide, to which acts Dremo, Yonda and Peruzzi are currently signed. In July 2016, Davido signed a record deal with Sony's RCA Records. In October 2016, he released the 5-track EP Son of Mercy, which was supported by the singles "Gbagbe Oshi", "How Long" and "Coolest Kid in Africa". In April 2017, Davido re-negotiated his contract with Sony due to creative control issues, and later that year he released five singles including "If" and "Fall". "If" generated worldwide social media activity while "Fall" became the longest-charting Nigerian pop song in Billboard history. Davido released his second studio album A Good Time in November 2019. It was supported by the previously released singles "If", "Fall", "Assurance", "Blow My Mind" and "Risky".

Davido was cited as one of the Top 100 most influential Africans by New African magazine in 2019. His third studio album A Better Time was released on November 13, 2020. In February 2021, he appeared on Time magazines Time 100 Next List. Davido is a cultural ambassador for Nigeria and a prominent voice of human rights on the African continent. He is one of the most followed African artists on both Instagram and Twitter.

Early life 

David Adedeji Adeleke was born on 21 November 1992, in Atlanta, Georgia. His father Adedeji Adeleke is a business magnate and his mother Vero Adeleke was a university lecturer. Davido is the youngest of five siblings and his father's second-born son. He attended the British International School in Lagos, and at the age of 16, he moved back to the United States to study business administration at Oakwood University in Alabama.

Davido bought musical equipment while at Oakwood and started making beats. He also worked with his cousins B-Red and Sina Rambo to form the music act KB International. Davido dropped out of Oakwood University to pursue music full-time and relocated to London, where he worked on his vocals. After returning to Nigeria in 2011, Davido paused his music career and agreed to honor his father by enrolling at Babcock University. In July 2015, he graduated from Babcock with a degree in music after his father paid the university to start a music department for an inaugural class of one student.

Musical career

2011–2012: Omo Baba Olowo 
Davido started working on his debut studio album Omo Baba Olowo in 2011. The album's music is a mixture of Afrobeats and hip hop. Davido worked with Jay Sleek, Maleek Berry, GospelOnDeBeatz, Spellz, Dokta Frabz, Mr. Chidoo, Theory Soundz and Shizzi to produce the album. Omo Baba Olowo features guest appearances from Naeto C, Sina Rambo, B-Red, Kayswitch, Ice Prince and 2 Face Idibia. It received generally negative reviews from music critics, who panned its lyrical content and Davido's songwriting. The album won Best R&B/Pop Album and received a nomination for Album of the Year at The Headies 2013. It was also nominated for Best Album of the Year at the 2013 Nigeria Entertainment Awards.

The Naeto C-assisted track "Back When" was released as the album's lead single on May 7, 2011. It was produced by Davido and received frequent airplay. Davido told television channel Factory 78 he recorded "Back When" in London. The Clarence Peters-directed music video for "Back When" was uploaded to YouTube on May 9, 2011. The album's second single "Dami Duro", which was released on October 30, 2011, was jointly produced by Davido and Shizzi. In an interview posted on the NotJustOk website, Davido said he recorded the song in August of that year. The song was leaked three months after he sent it to some of his friends. The accompanying music video for "Dami Duro" was released on January 8, 2012, during the Occupy Nigeria protests.

The album's third single "Ekuro" was released on January 25, 2012. Its music video was recorded and directed in Miami by Antwan Smith. Nigerian singer Aramide released a soulful rendition of the song. The album's fourth single "Overseas" was released on May 6, 2012; an unfinished version of the song was leaked prior to its official release. The GospelOnDeBeatz-produced track "All of You" was released as the album's fifth single on September 28, 2012. Davido told Factory 78 TV he recorded the song with GospelOnDeBeatz after meeting him at a mall.

2013–2016: Standalone releases, The Baddest and Son of Mercy 

On February 25, 2013, Davido released the Shizzi-produced track "Gobe". It was ranked second on Premium Times list of the Top 10 songs of 2013. In a review for Vanguard newspaper, Charles Mgbolu said the song "exudes fun from start to finish". The music video for "Gobe" was recorded in South Africa by Godfather Productions. Davido announced on Twitter that "One of a Kind" would be released on May 13, 2013. The song was also produced by Shizzi. The video for "One of a Kind" was recorded and directed in South Africa by Tebza of Godfather Productions. It depicts a united Africa that is rich in culture and music.

"Skelewu" was released on August 13, 2013. It was ranked fifth on Premium Times list of the top 10 songs of 2013. Davido promoted "Skelewu" on August 18, 2013, by uploading an instructional dance video that was directed by Jassy Generation to YouTube. The video's release was accompanied by an announcement of a "Skelewu" dance competition. "Skelewu" was supported with two music videos. The first music video, directed by Sesan, was released on October 15, 2013. It was uploaded to YouTube using a parody account. Shortly after the video's release, Davido said someone betrayed him by releasing it and that he would make another video with Moe Musa, a UK based music video director. In a statement released by his team, Sesan said Davido was satisfied with his contributions to the music video; he also said it would be immature for Davido and his management to release inaccurate statements to defame his brand. The official music video for "Skelewu" was recorded and directed in London by Moe Musa, and was released in October 2013.

On February 1, 2014, Davido released "Aye." The track was produced by T-Spize. The video for the song was directed by Clarence Peters and released on February 7, 2014. In the video, Davido plays a poor farmer who falls in love with the prince's fiancé. Davido's collaborative single with South African duo Mafikizolo, titled "Tchelete (Goodlife)", was released on April 30, 2014. It was produced by Oskido and Shizzi, and distributed by MTN's Play and Callertunez platforms. Prior to recording "Tchelete (Goodlife)", Davido networked with Mafikizolo at MTN Nigeria's Elite Night event in December 2013. The music video for "Tchelete (Goodlife)" was recorded and directed by Twenty Twenty Media. Oskido and Uhuru made cameo appearances in the video.

In June 2014, Davido collaborated with Mi Casa, Lola Rae, Sarkodie, Diamond Platnumz and Tiwa Savage on "Africa Rising", a song that was used for DStv's eponymous campaign to inspire Africans to partake in community-based social investment projects. The accompanying music video for "Africa Rising" was recorded and directed by South African production house Callback Dreams. The artists performed the song at the Africa Rising launch ceremony in Mauritius. In June 2015, Davido released the Meek Mill-assisted trap song "Fans Mi". He teased fans with the audio and behind-the-scene photographs of the video prior to releasing it.

Davido's 20-track album The Baddest was first scheduled for release in June 2015 but its release was postponed to October 10 that year. Two days prior to this date, the album was delayed because of an unnamed corporation's interest in distributing it. Davido had released the album's cover art and track listing earlier that year. The Baddest was going to feature production from Shizzi, Del B, Spellz, J Fem, Don Jazzy, Puffy Tee, Uhuru, Kiddominant and Young John. It was also going to feature guest artists such as P-Square, Don Jazzy, Runtown, Uhuru, DJ Buckz, Akon, Meek Mill, Wale and Trey Songz. In January 2016, Davido announced on Twitter he signed a record deal with Sony Music; his announcement was met with mixed reactions. The record label put out a press release to confirm the deal. Davido's record deal with Sony requires him to release two albums and allows him to retain the rights to his music and performances.

Davido founded the record label Davido Music Worldwide (DMW) a few months after signing with Sony. Dremo, Mayorkun, Yonda and Peruzzi are currently signed to the label. In July 2016, Davido signed a record deal with RCA Records. His record deal with Sony Music altered plans for The Baddests release. According to Pulse Nigeria, Davido's contract with Sony required the album to have an international appeal to allow for global distribution of it. In October 2016, he released the 5-track EP Son of Mercy, which was supported by the singles "Gbagbe Oshi", "How Long" and "Coolest Kid in Africa". The EP features guest appearances from Simi, Tinashe and Nasty C.

2017–2018: "If", "Fall", "Fia" and "Assurance" 
Davido won Best African Act at the 2017 MOBO Awards. He released "If" on February 17, 2017. It was produced by Tekno, who ghost-wrote the track for Davido. The song was a certified diamond by the Recording Industry of South Africa, indicating shipments of 200,000 units. "If" won Best Pop Single and Song of the Year at The Headies 2018. Reviewing for OkayAfrica, Sabo Kpade described the song as a "slow burner" with an "unfussy beat that sounds hollowed out and isn't cluttered with instruments". The music video for "If" was recorded in London; it was directed by Director Q and produced by Tunde Babalola. Davido teamed up with menswear designer Orange Culture to release a capsule collection inspired by "If".

Davido released "Fall" on June 2, 2017. It samples a line from Kojo Funds's track "Dun Talking". "Fall" was certified platinum by the Recording Industry of South Africa, was one of the top-100-most-Shazam-searched singles in America in January 2019, and was a top-10 record on Shazam in New York. In February 2019, it became the longest-charting Nigerian pop song in Billboard history. "Fall" was ranked at number 163 on Pitchforks list of the 200 Best Songs of the 2010s. The accompanying music video for "Fall" was directed by Nigerian-born British video director Daps. In December 2018, the video surpassed 100 million views, becoming the most-viewed video by a Nigerian artist on YouTube.

Davido released "Fia" on November 10, 2017. The song was described as a neo-highlife track and was produced by Fresh VDM. In its second verse, Davido addresses his arrest and Caroline Danjuma's role in fueling the rumor he was involved in the death of Tagbo Umenike. A writer for Native magazine praised Davido's songwriting and said the song "manages to reflect some of his recent personal struggles, without directly dishing into sensitive details". Reviewing for Music in Africa, Kayode Faniyi said "Fia" offers an "existential conflict" and that it is "undoubtedly the song of Davido's career—at least till he outdoes himself". Daniel Orubo of Konbini Channels described "Fia" as a "coherent" track that uses Davido's "croaky voice". "Fia" was nominated for Best Pop Single and Song of the Year at The Headies 2018. The accompanying music video for "Fia" was directed by Clarence Peters. The Stefflon Don-assisted remix of "Fia" was released on March 30, 2018. The song retains many of the elements from the original recording but incorporates a patois-tinged flow. Davido won Best African Act and was one of the Best Worldwide Act recipients at the 2017 MTV Europe Music Awards. Davido released "Assurance" on April 30, 2018. He dedicated the track to his girlfriend and released it to coincide with her 23rd birthday. Reviewing for Native magazine, Toye Sokunbi said the song "speaks volumes for the importance of clarity in the age of emojis, validation from our loved ones and putting love first, against all odds". Davido won Best International Act at the 2018 BET Awards, becoming the first African artist to receive his award on the main stage. In his acceptance speech, he urged patrons and American artists to visit Africa and eat the food.

In September 2018, Davido performed alongside Meek Mill, Post Malone and Fat Joe at the Made in America Festival. Prior to the festival, he performed at the House of Blues in Boston as part of his "The Locked Up Tour", which commenced in August and ended in September.

2019: O2 Arena concert, "Blow My Mind", "Risky", and A Good Time 

In January 2019, Davido sold out The O2 Arena in London, becoming the first solo African artist to do so after Wizkid headlined a concert there in 2018. He was introduced on stage by Idris Elba and performed several of his hit singles with the backing band The Compozers. Caroline Sullivan of The Guardian gave the concert four stars out of five, calling Davido an "alpha" and saying "many of his mannerisms are influenced by the American rappers with whom he has worked, including Young Thug and Swae Lee".

The Chris Brown-assisted track "Blow My Mind" was released on July 26, 2019. It was produced by Shizzi and was initially intended to be released as the album's lead single. "Blow My Mind" contains lyrics about a girl who blows Davido's mind simply. In the Edgar Esteves-directed visuals for "Blow My Mind", Davido and Chris Brown spend quality time in a motel with their lovers. The video amassed one million views in 11 hours, surpassing Wizkid's "Fever" and "Come Closer" to become the Nigerian music video to achieve this feat most quickly. It also became the Nigerian music video to gain the most views within the first 24 hours of its release. "Risky" was released on October 23, 2019. It features guest vocals from Jamaican singer Popcaan, who asked Davido to appear on his 2018 single "Dun Rich". The music video for "Risky" was directed by Meji Alabi and pays homage to the crime drama television series Top Boy. In the video, a female member of Davido's and Popcaan's crew informs upon them to police.

Davido's second studio album A Good Time was released on November 22, 2019. The album features the previously released singles "If", "Fall", "Assurance", "Blow My Mind" and "Risky". Davido recorded A Good Time in Atlanta. He told Vibe magazine he wanted to record in a new environment. Davido described the album as a body of work for everybody and said it would consist predominantly of Afrobeats but would incorporate elements of other genres. Davido disclosed the album's title during an event held in Lagos in September 2019 and said it would be released the following month. He also unveiled excerpts of four songs from the album during the event. Following his performance at Powerhouse 2019, Davido spoke with Power 105.1's DJ Self and said the album will feature collaborations with artists including Summer Walker, Gunna, A Boogie and Chris Brown. All but one of the tracks on A Good Time were produced by Nigerian producers. The album's cover art features Davido, his father and a sculpture of his mother. In July 2020, A Good Time surpassed 1 billion streams across various digital platforms.

2020present: A Better Time and social media fundraising 
In May 2020, Davido was featured on Billboard magazine's cover story, titled "Africa Now", alongside Mr Eazi and Tiwa Savage. The cover story features photography by Lakin Ogunbanwo and Seye Isikalu, and styling by Daniel Obasi and Quinton Faulkner. The story was written by Gail Mitchell and features interviews with the three artists. Conducted over a video conference call, the artists addressed several topics, including life under quarantine and afrobeats as a category.

Davido first revealed plans to release his third studio album, A Better Time, on Twitter. He said he recorded 11 tracks for the album and announced that the record would feature Tiwa Savage. He also revealed that he and everyone who worked on the album spent 14 days putting all the tracks together. In July 2020, Davido appeared on the Tonight Show Starring Jimmy Fallon to perform a medley of his songs "D&G" and "Fall", from the album A Good Time.  On August 28, 2020, the Grammy Museum announced Davido as a special guest in its Mentorship Monday series. He participated in the museum's Instagram Live event, which was held three days later. 

On September 10, 2020, he released the Dammy Twitch-produced single "FEM", along with its music video. The visuals for "FEM" received 1.8 Million YouTube views in less than 24 hours, breaking his own record for the fastest Nigerian music video to hit 1 million views on YouTube, a record previously held by his own song "Blow My Mind", featuring Chris Brown. "FEM" peaked at number one on the Nigeria TurnTable Top 50 chart in its second week of eligibility, dethroning Wizkid's "Ginger".

A Better Time was released on November 13, 2020. It features guest appearances from Lil Baby, Nicki Minaj, Nas, Chris Brown, and Young Thug, among others. Davido recorded the album after canceling his 2019 North American tour as a result of the ongoing COVID-19 pandemic. On November 17, 2021, Davido challenged his colleagues and fans to send him one million naira. He noted that anyone who doesn't participate in the challenge should not associate with him anymore. He was able to raise 200 million naira in total and added an additional 50 million naira of his own money; he donated all of the money to orphanage homes in Nigeria. 

In March 2022, Davido was featured on the single "Hayya Hayya (Better Together)", alongside American singer Trinidad Cardona and Qatari singer Aisha. The song first appeared on the compilation album, FIFA World Cup Qatar 2022 Official Soundtrack (2022). In May 2022, Davido released the Pheelz-produced track "Stand Strong"; it serves as his first solo release of the year and features vocals by the Sunday Service Choir ensemble. In September 2022, Davido announced his first annual Are We African Yet (A.W.A.Y) music festival. It was held at the State Farm Arena in Atlanta, Georgia, on November 18, 2022, and featured additional performances from Kizz Daniel, Pheelz, Lojay and BNXN.

Other ventures 

On April 6, 2012, Nigerian Entertainment Today reported Davido had signed a ₦30 million endorsement deal with MTN. The deal unveiled him as the face of MTN Pulse, a marketing campaign aimed at Nigerian youth. On October 24, 2013, Pulse Nigeria reported that Guinness Nigeria had signed Davido for an endorsement deal. As part of the deal, he performed at the Guinness World of More Concert alongside artists including P-Square, D'banj, Wizkid, Ice Prince, Burna Boy, Olamide, Phyno, Chidinma, Waje and Tiwa Savage.

In May 2018, Davido signed an endorsement deal with Infinix Mobile, a Hong Kong-based smartphone manufacturer. In May 2021, he became an official brand ambassador for the sports betting brand, 1xBet. In October 2021, the cognac brand Martell announced him as its new ambassador. In December 2021, Davido signed a long-term agreement with Puma and became a global brand ambassador for the footwear company.

Personal life 
Davido has four children: two boys and two girls.

Death of son 
On October 31, 2022, Peoples Gazette newspaper reported the death of David Ifeanyi Adeleke Jr., the first son and third child of Davido, who drowned in the swimming pool at his father's Banana Island residence; he was three years old at the time of his death. Members of Davido's household staff were questioned by the police. A total of eight domestic workers were invited to the police station for questioning after one had initially gone to the police station to report the drowning accident. Following the police's investigation, six workers were released and two remained in detention.

Discography 
Studio albums
Omo Baba Olowo (2012)
A Good Time (2019)
A Better Time (2020)
EPs
Son of Mercy (2016)

Tours 
A Good Time North America Tour (2019–2020)

Singles (partial)

See also 
 List of awards and nominations received by Davido
 List of Yoruba people
 List of Nigerian musicians

References

External links 

 

Living people
1992 births
Musicians from Atlanta
American people of Yoruba descent
21st-century Nigerian male singers
Nigerian male singer-songwriters
Nigerian record producers
The Headies winners
21st-century American male musicians
Oakwood University alumni
Yoruba-language singers
Babcock University alumni
RCA Records artists
Nigerian male pop singers
Adeleke family
Yoruba people
People from Osun State
Fifa World Cup ceremonies performers